For What You Are Is Never Seen is the first album by Herman van Doorn.

Tracks
 My love is you
 A timeless place
 Something's coming
 Clearly beloved, dearly beloved
 Strangers in the night
 Cancioneiro
 Someone must know
 Brother, where are you
 The good life
 I'm old fashioned
 You and I

References

1999 albums